Ousmane Zeidine Ahmeye (born 9 June 1994), is a Nigerien footballer who plays as a forward.

Career

Club
In June 2013, Ahmeye signed for French Ligue 2 side Angers. On 17 August 2016, Ahmeye signed for Kyrgyzstan League side Dordoi Bishkek.

International
Ahmeye made his debut for the Niger national team against Burkina Faso on 23 March 2013.

Career statistics

International

Statistics accurate as of match played 23 March 2013

Honours

Club
Dordoi Bishkek
 Kyrgyzstan Cup (1): 2016

References

External links

Living people
1994 births
Nigerien footballers
Nigerien expatriate footballers
Akokana FC players
AS FAN players
FC Dordoi Bishkek players
Heartland F.C. players
Rangers International F.C. players
Championnat National 3 players
Association football forwards
Expatriate footballers in France
Expatriate footballers in Kyrgyzstan
Expatriate footballers in Nigeria
Niger international footballers